Raymond Neck Historic District is a national historic district located near Leipsic, Kent County, Delaware. It encompasses eight contributing buildings and four contributing structures in a rural area near Leipsic.  There are three two-story, center hall plan, brick dwellings dated between 1820 and 1867 and known as the John Raymond house (c. 1830), James Hoffecker house (c. 1820), and Robert Wilson's "Hebron" (1867).  The other contributing buildings and structures are related outbuildings.

It was listed on the National Register of Historic Places in 1982.

References

Historic districts in Kent County, Delaware
Historic districts on the National Register of Historic Places in Delaware
National Register of Historic Places in Kent County, Delaware